Malcolm Austin (24 May 1880 – 8 January 1958) was a Guyanese cricketer. He played in seven first-class matches for British Guiana from 1903 to 1913.

See also
 List of Guyanese representative cricketers

References

External links
 

1880 births
1958 deaths
Guyanese cricketers
Guyana cricketers
People from Thornbury, Gloucestershire
British people in British Guiana